The year 1602 in science and technology involved some significant events.

Astronomy
 Thomas Blundeville publishes The Theoriques of the Seuen Planets, assisted by Lancelot Browne.

Chemistry
 Vincenzio Cascarido discovers barium sulfide.
 Commencement of publication of Theatrum Chemicum, a compendium of European alchemical writings.

Exploration
 May 15 – Bartolomew Gosnold becomes the first European to discover Cape Cod.
 Henry Briggs publishes his first mathematical work A Table to find the Height of the Pole, the Magnetical Declination being given in London.

Medicine
 Felix Plater publishes Praxis medica classifying diseases by their symptoms.

Physics
 Galileo begins his study of falling bodies.

Births
 March 18 – Jacques de Billy, French Jesuit mathematician (died 1679)
 August 8 – Gilles de Roberval, French mathematician (died 1675)
 November 20 – Otto von Guericke, German physicist (died 1686)

Deaths
 July 28 – Peder Sørensen, Danish physician (born 1542)
 Juan de Fuca, Greek navigator (born 1536)

References

 
17th century in science
1600s in science